Henry Wharton (born 23 November 1967) is a British former professional boxer who competed from 1989 to 1998. He challenged three times for super middleweight world championships; the WBC twice, firstly in 1994 and again in 1997, and the WBO title in 1994. At regional level, he held the British super middleweight title in 1992; the Commonwealth super middleweight title from 1991 to 1996; and the EBU European super middleweight title from 1995 to 1996. Wharton is best remembered for his world title fights with Nigel Benn and Chris Eubank in 1994.

Personal life
In 2012, Wharton was involved in a fight where he was cut with a machete as he fought three men. North Yorkshire Police said when speaking to York Press "He's lucky to be alive". A few days earlier he was hit by a car after he reportedly tried to intervene in a pre-arranged bare-knuckle fight between members of the travelling community.

He currently resides in York. In 2013, Henry's Gym opened up on York Road. He is currently training professional George Davey who is signed under Frank Warren.

Professional career

Early career 
Wharton made his professional debut on 21 September 1989, scoring a first-round technical knockout (TKO) victory over Dean Murray at the Great Yorkshire Showground in Harrogate, England. After winning his next 9 fights, 7 by knockout, Wharton won the vacant Commonwealth super middleweight title on 27 June 1991, beating Australian Rod Carr via points decision. On 30 October, Wharton fought Lou Gent to a draw, retaining his Commonwealth title. He won his next three fights, two by stoppage, before challenging Fidel Castro Smith for the British super middleweight title on 23 September 1992, winning the title by points decision. Wharton won his next three fights, all by stoppage, bringing his record to 18-0-1 (13 KOs).

World championship attempts 
On 26 February 1994, Wharton challenged Nigel Benn (37-2-1 32 KOs) for the WBC super middleweight title at Earls Court Exhibition Hall, London, England. It would be Benn's fifth defence of the WBC title. Wharton went the distance with Benn, but ultimately lost by unanimous decision, with the three judges scoring the bout 117-112, 116-114 and 116-113.

His second attempt at a world title came just 10 months later on 10 December 1994, against undefeated WBO super middleweight champion Chris Eubank (40-0-2 19 KOs) at G-Mex Centre, Manchester, England. It would be Eubank's fifteenth defence of his world title. Wharton again lost by unanimous decision, with the judges’ scorecards reading 118-112, 116-112 and 115-113.

Wharton's third and final chance at world honours came on 3 May 1997 at Nynex Arena, Manchester, England, against undefeated WBC super middleweight champion Robin Reid in what was Reid's second defence of the belt. Wharton lost by majority decision with scores of 118-111, 117-113 and 114-114.

Professional boxing record

References

External links

Henry's Gym

1967 births
Cruiserweight boxers
English male boxers
Light-heavyweight boxers
Living people
Martial artists from Leeds
Middleweight boxers
Super-middleweight boxers